The 2009 Washington State Cougars football team represented Washington State University in the 2009 NCAA Division I FBS football season. Head coach Paul Wulff was in his second season, and the team played its home games on campus at Martin Stadium in Pullman, Washington. The Cougars finished the season with a record of 1–11 (0–9 Pac-10).

Schedule

Game summaries

Stanford

Toby Gerhart rushed for 121 yards and two touchdowns, and redshirt freshman quarterback Andrew Luck made his collegiate debut by throwing for 193 yards and a touchdown pass to Chris Owusu as Stanford defeated Washington State in Pullman. The Cardinal dominated the first half, but as the second half began, the Cougars took the early momentum, driving 80 yards and scoring on a 5-yard pass from Kevin Lopina to Jared Karstetter. However, Owusu answered immediately for the Cardinal with an 85-yard kickoff return for a touchdown to keep the game out of reach.

Hawaii

Southern Methodist

USC

Oregon

Arizona State

California

In the first quarter, passes from Kevin Riley to Jahvid Best and Marvin Jones gave Cal a 14-point lead. Jeremy Ross returned Washington State punter Reid Forrest's 42-yard punt for a 76-yard touchdown. After Nico Grasu kicked a 24-yard field goal to put the Cougars on the scoreboard, Riley completed another pass for Cal for another touchdown, this time to Shane Vereen.

Jahvid Best rushed for 61 yards for a touchdown in the second quarter to give the Bears a 32-point lead and again in the third quarter with a 2-yard run. The final Cal score came in the fourth quarter when Vereen rushed for a 7-yard touchdown.

Notre Dame

Nick Tausch kicked a 29-yard field goal to put Dotre Dame on the scoreboard. Then Jimmy Clausen passed to Duval Kamara for a 7-yard touchdown in the first quarter. In the second quarter, Golden Tate scored on a 16-yard run for a touchdown and Robert Hughes rushed for a 1-yard for another touchdown.

Arizona

UCLA

The Bruins scored on their first offensive play after an interception, a Kevin Prince to Taylor Embree touchdown pass.

Oregon State

Washington

References

Washington State
Washington State Cougars football seasons
Washington State Cougars football